is a railway station in the city of Minokamo, Gifu Prefecture, Japan, operated by Central Japan Railway Company (JR Central) and the third-sector railway operator Nagaragawa Railway.

Lines
It is also a terminal station for the JR central Taita Line and the Nagaragawa Railway Etsumi-Nan Line.

Station layout
Mino-Ōta Station has two ground-level island platforms with an elevated station building and a Midori no Madoguchi staffed ticket office serving the JR Central portion of the station. The Nagaragawa Railway portion of the station has a single unnumbered ground-level side platform serving a single bi-directional track.

Platforms

Adjacent stations

History
Mino-Ōta Station opened on November 12, 1921. The station was absorbed into the JR Central network upon the privatization of Japanese National Railways (JNR) on April 1, 1987. A new station building was completed in March 1998.

Station numbering was introduced to the Taita Line and Takayama Main Line in March 2018; Mino-Ōta Station was assigned station numbers CI00 for the Taita Line and CG07 for the Takayayama Main Line.

Passenger statistics
In fiscal 2016, the JR portion of the station was used by an average of 2,446 passengers daily (boarding passengers only). The Nagaragawa Railway portion of the station was used by 416 passengers daily.

Surrounding area
Minokamo City Hall

 Kiso River

See also
 List of Railway Stations in Japan

References

Railway stations in Gifu Prefecture
Takayama Main Line
Taita Line
Stations of Nagaragawa Railway
Railway stations in Japan opened in 1921
Stations of Central Japan Railway Company
Minokamo, Gifu